Jamie Smith is a former professional rugby league footballer who played in the 1990s and 2000s. He played for Barrow, Hull F.C., Workington Town and Leigh in England. Smith also played for Parramatta in the ARL competition.

Playing career
Smith began his rugby league career at Barrow where he played two seasons. In 1996, Smith played eight games for Workington Town in the Super League. Workington were relegated from the Super League at season's end having only won two games. In 1997, Smith joined the Australian side Parramatta where he played four games which were all from the interchange bench.

Smith later returned to England and played with Hull F.C. in the Super League for two seasons when they were briefly known as "Hull Sharks". In 2000, he returned to his first club Barrow before finishing his career with Leigh.

References

Parramatta Eels players
Hull F.C. players
Barrow Raiders players
Workington Town players
Leigh Leopards players
Rugby league wingers
Rugby league fullbacks
1976 births
Living people